This article shows all participating team squads at the 2005 FIVB Women's World Grand Champions Cup, held from November 15 to November 20, 2005 in Japan.

The following is the Brazil roster in the 2005 FIVB Women's World Grand Champions Cup.

The following is the China roster in the 2005 FIVB Women's World Grand Champions Cup.

The following is the Japan roster in the 2005 FIVB Women's World Grand Champions Cup.

The following is the Poland roster in the 2005 FIVB Women's World Grand Champions Cup.

The following is the South Korea roster in the 2005 FIVB Women's World Grand Champions Cup.

The following is the United States roster in the 2005 FIVB Women's World Grand Champions Cup.

References 

G
FIVB Women's Volleyball World Grand Champions Cup squads